James Garfield Gardiner  (30 November 1883 – 12 January 1962) was a Canadian farmer, educator, and politician. He served as the fourth premier of Saskatchewan, and as a minister in the Canadian Cabinet.

Political career
Gardiner was first elected to the Legislative Assembly of Saskatchewan in 1914, served as Minister of Highways (1922–1926) in the government of Premier Charles A. Dunning from 1922, and succeeded Dunning as premier in 1926. A highly-partisan Liberal, his government lost its majority in the legislature in the 1929 election both from patronage scandals and partly through an anti-French, anti-Catholic and anti-immigrant campaign waged by the Ku Klux Klan. Although the Conservative Party had won fewer seats, it was able to defeat the Gardiner government through a motion of no confidence and then formed a "co-operative government" with the support of some Progressive Party and independent Members of the Legislative Assembly.

As Leader of the Opposition, Gardiner accused James Anderson's Conservative government of bigotry and alleged that it was linked with the Klan. Gardiner defeated Anderson in the 1934 election and became premier a second time. In 1935, he was involved in negotiations to end the On-to-Ottawa Trek in Regina.

Gardiner left provincial politics later in 1935 to join the federal cabinet of Liberal Prime Minister William Lyon Mackenzie King as Minister of Agriculture. He was elected to the House of Commons a few months later. Gardiner held the agriculture portfolio for 22 years until the 1957 federal election resulted the Liberal government bring defeated. Gardiner also served as the first Minister of National War Services, during July 12, 1940June 10, 1941. Gardiner was a powerful figure in both the King and St. Laurent governments.

In 1947, he was sworn into the Imperial Privy Council, which allowed him use of the prenominal honorific The Right Honourable.

Gardiner ran for the leadership of the Liberal Party of Canada at the 1948 Liberal leadership convention but lost to Louis St. Laurent. He remained in the House of Commons of Canada until he lost his seat in the 1958 Diefenbaker sweep.

Personal life
Gardiner was married three times: first to Rosetta Jane Gardiner in 1912, then to Violet McEwen in 1917 and finally to Isabella (Scott) Christie in 1944. His son James Wilfrid Gardiner served in the Saskatchewan Legislative Assembly. His other son, Pilot Officer John Edwin (1919–1942), serving with Number 403 Squadron, RCAF, was killed in action while providing air cover and support during the Dieppe Raid on August 19, 1942. The Gardiner family farm was near Lemberg, Saskatchewan.

Legacy
As premier of Saskatchewan in 1928, Gardiner championed the Saskatchewan Sanitoria and Hospitals Act, the first legislation to provide free hospitalization and treatment for victims of tuberculosis anywhere in North America. It was passed unanimously by the provincial legislature on January 1, 1929, and is probably one of his least-known legacies to Saskatchewan public policy.

As Minister of National War Services during World War II, Gardiner made a way for conscientious objectors in Canada to perform alternate, non-military service. After a delegation from Canada's Anabaptist peace churches was stymied by deputy ministers, they approached Gardiner directly, where they got a much warmer reception; as Gardiner was a member of the United Church of Canada, which is also theologically committed to global peace. The National War Services Regulations were amended by Parliament on December 24, 1940, to allow for alternate service.

Saskatchewan's Gardiner Dam, declared open on June 21, 1967, is named after him.

In 2006, the CBC agreed to pull the movie Prairie Giant: The Tommy Douglas Story from all broadcasts in response to criticism about its portrayals of Gardiner.

Electoral history

Saskatchewan general elections, 1929 and 1934 

Gardiner led the Liberal Party in two general elections, in 1929 and 1934.  The 1929 election resulted in a Conservative minority government, but Gardiner won the 1934 election with a majority government.

1929 General election 

Gardiner had succeeded Dunning as premier in 1926, and led the Liberals into the general election in 1929.  Although Gardiner and the Liberals won pluralities in the popular vote and seats in the Assembly, they did not hold a majority.  Gardiner chose to face the Assembly in hopes of obtaining sufficient support from some of the opposition members to maintain his government, but he lost a vote on a confidence matter and resigned.  He was replaced as premier by James Anderson, whose Conservative Party held the second-greatest number of seats.

1 Premier when election was called;  lost confidence motion in the Assembly after the election;  resigned as Premier and became Leader of the Opposition.
2 Co-Leader of the Opposition when the election was called; became Premier after successful non-confidence vote.

1934 General election 

Gardiner remained leader of the Liberals and led them into the 1934 election, at the depths of the Great Depression.  The Liberals won a substantial majority government, taking fifty of the fifty-five seats in the Legislative Assembly.  The election was a crushing defeat for the Conservatives under Anderson, who failed to win a single seat. The Farmer-Labour Party won five seats and formed the Opposition.

1 Leader of the Opposition when election was called;  Premier after the election.
2 Party leader during the election, but failed to win seat;  role as Leader of the Opposition taken by George Hara Williams
3 Premier when election was called;  lost seat in the election and retired.

Saskatchewan constituency elections 

Gardiner stood for election to the Legislative Assembly seven times, once in a by-election and in six general elections.  He was elected six times in the constituency of North Qu'Appelle, and the seventh and last election in the constituency of Melville.  He was elected twice by acclamation, and five times in contested elections.

1914 By-election:  North Qu'Appelle 

The by-election was called on the resignation of the sitting Conservative member, John Archibald McDonald, who admitted to "corrupt practices" by his agent in the 1912 general election.

E Elected.

1917 General election:  North Qu'Appelle 

E Elected.
X Incumbent.

1921 General election:  North Qu'Appelle 

E Elected.
X Incumbent.

1922 By-election:  North Qu'Appelle 

The by-election was called on Gardiner accepting the position of Minister of Highways in the Cabinet of Premier Dunning, an office of profit under the Crown, on April 5, 1922.
E Elected.
X Incumbent.

1925 General election:  North Qu'Appelle 

E Elected.
X Incumbent.

1929 General election:  North Qu'Appelle 

E Elected.
X Incumbent.

1934 General election:  Melville 

E Elected.
X Incumbent.

Federal constituency elections, 1936 to 1958 

Gardiner stood for election to the House of Commons seven times from 1936 to 1958, in two different Saskatchewan ridings (Assiniboia originally, and then Melville for the next six elections).  He was elected six times.  After his defeat in the 1958 election, he retired from politics.

1936 By-election:  Assiniboia 

By-election called after the sitting Liberal MP, Robert McKenzie, accepted an office of profit under the Crown on December 9, 1935.

E Elected.

1940 General Election:  Melville 

E Elected.

1945 General Election:  Melville 

E Elected. 
X Incumbent.

1949 General Election:  Melville 

E Elected. 
X Incumbent.

1953 General Election:  Melville 

E Elected.
X Incumbent.
1 Rounding error.

1957 General Election:  Melville 

E Elected. 
X Incumbent.

1958 General Election:  Melville 

E Elected. 
X Incumbent.

References

External links 

Encyclopedia of Saskatchewan Entry

1883 births
1962 deaths
Liberal Party of Canada MPs
Liberal Party of Canada leadership candidates
Members of the House of Commons of Canada from Saskatchewan
Canadian members of the Privy Council of the United Kingdom
Members of the King's Privy Council for Canada
Members of the United Church of Canada
People from Huron County, Ontario
Premiers of Saskatchewan
Saskatchewan Liberal Party MLAs
Persons of National Historic Significance (Canada)
Leaders of the Saskatchewan Liberal Party